Ward O. Winer is an American engineer, currently the Regents' Professor Emeritus at Georgia Institute of Technology. He is an Elected Fellow of the American Association for the Advancement of Science, Society of Tribologists and Lubrication Engineers, American Society for Engineering Education and ASME. 

He received his B.S. (1958) and M.S. (1959) degrees from the University of Michigan and his PhD (1964) from the University of Cambridge in the Cavendish Laboratory.

He was awarded the Tribology Gold Medal from the Institution of Mechanical Engineers (IMechE) in 1972. He received the Mayo D. Hersey Award from the American Society of Mechanical Engineers in 1986. He was elected to the National Academy of Engineering in 1988. He received the International Award from the Society of Tribologists and Lubrication Engineers in 1997. He is a member of the Distinguished Advisory Board for the International Tribology Council.

References

Year of birth missing (living people)
Living people
Fellows of the American Association for the Advancement of Science
Georgia Tech faculty
21st-century American engineers
Fellows of the American Society for Engineering Education
Fellows of the American Society of Mechanical Engineers
Tribologists